Nadezhda Yordanova (Bulgarian: Надежда Йорданова; born 6 March 1973) is a Bulgarian jurist and politician who served as minister of justice in Kiril Petkov's government (December 2021-June 2022).

Biography 
Nadezhda Yordanova was born in Kubrat, Bulgaria on 6 March 1973. She studied at Sofia University, specializing in English trading rights at the The University of Law. Since 2007 she has been a member of the bar in Razgrad.

On 13 December 2021 she was elected as Minister of Justice in the cabinet of Kiril Petkov.

She is married and has one child.

References 

1973 births
Living people
21st-century Bulgarian politicians
21st-century Bulgarian women politicians
Bulgarian jurists
Sofia University alumni
People from Kubrat (town)
Women government ministers of Bulgaria
Justice ministers of Bulgaria
Female justice ministers